Matthew Hamilton of Milnburn and Binning (died 1569) was a Scottish landowner and courtier.

Early life
He was a son of Matthew Hamilton in Milnburn or Mylnburn or Milburne in Dalserf. The Mill Burn flows into the River Clyde north of the village.

Career
Matthew Hamilton was appointed a gentleman and squire in the king's household in 1529.

In February 1542 James V of Scotland sent Robert Hamilton of Briggis and Matthew Hamilton of Milnburn to France. They were allowed to return by Regent Arran in January 1543.

He was a Master of Household to Regent Arran, and Captain of Blackness Castle. In 1545 he was paid for "furnishing" the Regent's house (with food), and paying household fees. John Knox identifies Matthew Hamilton as an opponent of the Scottish Reformation in 1559, and his brother Master John Hamilton as an unlearned cleric.

Master John Hamilton of Milnburn was Master of Works to Mary, Queen of Scots in 1547, and sent as ambassador to France. According to John Knox he fell and died at Dumbarton Castle on his return. In 1543 John Hamilton was paid in connection with attempt of Arran to divorce his wife, Margaret Douglas, Countess of Arran. John Hamilton began building a rampart and blockhouse at Edinburgh Castle in February 1547. This work was completed as the spur fortification by an Italian military engineer, Migliorino Ubaldini.

Personal life
The children of Matthew Hamilton and his wife Agnes Livingstone included:
 Henry Hamilton, who died before his father. 
The name of the mother of his daughter is unknown;
 Libra Hamilton alias Robertson, who married firstly, Andrew Home of Prendergast, in Ayton. After his death she had the mills of Eyemouth and Coldingham in life-rent, and married William Home of Ayton. Libra Hamilton, Lady Ayton, was one of the women invited to wait on Anne of Denmark at her coronation in May 1590. In 1600 Anne of Denmark's tailor Peter Sanderson went to law over her debt of £54 for workmanship and merchandise supplied to her and her daughters and servants. Another contemporary called Libra Hamilton, (died 1592), was the wife of John Hamilton of Barncluith.

Following his death, Hamilton's estate passed to his brother, Robert Hamilton, in 1569.

References

16th-century Scottish people
1569 deaths
Court of James V of Scotland
Matthew